Kenny Blank (born September 15, 1977), also known as Kenn Michael, is an American actor, musician and director. Blank is best known for his role as Michael Peterson in the television series The Parent 'Hood from 1995 to 1997 for which he also composed some music, as well as his appearance in Eddie Murphy's 1992 film, Boomerang.

Early life
Blank was born as Kenneth Michael Benbow in New York City, New York on September 15, 1977, the son of Lola, a dancer for James Brown who later became Blank's manager, and Warren Benbow, a jazz drummer who has worked with Miles Davis and Stevie Wonder. His parents later divorced and Blank was raised by his mother and stepfather, Bob Blank, who owned a music studio.

By the time he was 6 years old, Blank played the piano and made short films. He graduated from Stamford High School in 1995. In the late 1990s, Blank was a student at the University of Southern California, where he studied filmmaking.

Career as performer
Blank began acting at the age of 7. As a child, Blank reviewed the book Jumanji on Reading Rainbow in the episode about the Macy's Thanksgiving Day Parade. He also narrated Bill Martin, Jr.'s "Knots on a Counting Rope" with Joseph Ruben Silverbird. His major breakthrough was his role as Tito in the 1991 Joe Pesci film The Super. For his performance as Tito, Blank was nominated for a Young Artist Award in 1992 in the Best Young Actor Co-starring in a Motion Picture category.

In 1991, he starred as Linus Bragg in the movie Carolina Skeletons (or The End of Silence), about an African-American boy in the mid-20th century South who was wrongfully executed at the age of 14. The movie was based on a novel, both of which were based on the true events regarding the arrest, conviction and execution of 14-year-old George Stinney. Blank had a small role in the feature film Boomerang (1992) and appeared in the miniseries Alex Haley's Queen.

He was a series regular on short-lived sitcom Tall Hopes (1993), playing aspiring director Ernest Harris. Although the series received poor reviews, Blank's performance as Ernest was well received. He portrayed teenager Michael Peterson in the sitcom The Parent 'Hood in the mid-1990s, also composing songs for the series. Blank left the series after its third season.

Blank acted in Silent Story  and Delivering Milo. Notable guest appearances on television shows include roles in Hangin' with Mr. Cooper, Moesha, City of Angels,  Living Single, and Freaks and Geeks. He also appeared as Jordy in the direct-to-video horror comedy Boltneck.

As a voice actor, Blank provided the voice of the character Darren Patterson on the Nickelodeon animated series As Told by Ginger (2000–06), as well as earning a small role in All Grown Up!, as Sulky Boy's band member J.T. He appears in the Saints Row video game series as one of the selectable voices of the Boss, the main character of the series. He is the only voice who is selectable in all games in the series. Blank provided the English dub voice of Angelino in Mutafukaz. He is also the English dub voice of Philly the Kid in Cannon Busters.

Other careers
Since 1998, Blank has cinematographed, edited and directed a number of short films. He made his directorial debut in 1999 on the theme song for Mystery Men. Blank exhibited an experimental film, Manifested Intent, at the Urbanworld Film Festival. In 2019, Blank directed the television film In Broad Daylight for TV One.

During the 1990s, he also worked as a composer, creating songs on The Montel Williams Show and providing the title theme for The Super. As a teenager, he contributed music to Kodak, Lego and commercials for other companies.

Filmography

Film

Television

Video games

References

External links

African-American male actors
American male child actors
American male film actors
American male television actors
American male voice actors
American male video game actors
Living people
21st-century African-American people
20th-century African-American people
1977 births